DR P6 Beat is one of DR's digital radio stations in Denmark. It launched on 11 April 2011 as the second of five new digital-only stations.

History 
In November 2010, DR announced it would significantly lower the number of digital radio stations in its line-up from 23 to between 10-12. The new line-up of digital stations were announced in January 2011 with P6 Beat as a station with focus on alternative music.

On 1 October 2017 P6 Beat became available on DAB+ radio when a nationwide switch-over took place.

Presenters 
 Alexander Lembourn
 Anders Bøtter
 Camilla Jane Lea
 Carsten Holm
 Casper Bach Hegstrup
 Henrik Aagaard
 Jacob Hinchely
 Jonas Hansen
 Mikael Simpson
 Rune Hedeman
 Tilde Bang-Hansen

P6 Beat rocker Koncerthuset 
Every December since 2012, P6 Beat has hosted a night of concerts at DR Koncerthuset, using all five venues at the same time. Attendees of the event are free to roam around the different venues.

Notes

Radio stations in Denmark
Radio stations established in 2011